Lists of ecoregions in the United States may refer to:

 List of ecoregions in the United States (EPA), United States Environmental Protection Agency system
 List of ecoregions in the United States (WWF), World Wildlife Fund system

Ecoregions